
In philosophy, intelligibility is what can be comprehended by the human mind in contrast to sense perception.  The intelligible method is thought thinking itself, or the human mind reflecting on itself.  Plato referred to the intelligible realm of mathematics, forms, first principles, logical deduction, and the dialectical method.  The intelligible realm of thought thinking about thought does not necessarily require any visual images, sensual impressions, and material causes for the contents of mind.  Descartes referred to this method of thought thinking about itself, without the possible illusions of the senses.  Kant made similar claims about a priori knowledge.  A priori knowledge is claimed to be independent of the content of experience.

Usage
The objects or concepts that have intelligibility may be called intelligible. Some possible examples are numbers and the logical law of non-contradiction.

There may be a distinction between everything that is intelligible and everything that is visible, called the intelligible world and the visible world in e.g. the analogy of the divided line as written by Plato.

Examples
The Absolute is generally regarded as being only partially intelligible. The Absolute is the idea of an unconditional reality which transcends limited, conditional, everyday existence. It is sometimes used as a term for God or the Divine. Other similar concepts are The One and First Cause.

See also
 A priori
 Descartes
 First Cause
 Idealism
 Intellect (disambiguation)
 Intelligible form
 Immaterialism
 Incorporeal
 Laws of Thought
 Neoplatonism
 Nous
 Plotinus
 Substantial form
 The Republic (Plato)
 Seventh Letter

References

Bibliography

Miguel Espinoza, A Theory of Intelligibility. A Contribution to the Revival of the Philosophy of Nature, Thombooks Press, Toronto, ON, 2020.

Philosophy of mind
A priori
Concepts in epistemology
Platonism